In baseball statistics, home runs allowed per 9 innings pitched (HR/9IP or HR/9) or home runs allowed per nine innings  (denoted by HR/9) is the average number of home runs given up by a pitcher per nine innings pitched. It is determined by multiplying the number of home runs allowed by nine and dividing by the number of innings pitched. Pitchers with high fly ball rates are more likely than pitchers with high ground ball rates to have high HR/9 rates.

Leaders
The career leaders in HR/9IP through 2018 were Jim Devlin (0.0448), Al Spalding	(0.0468), and Reb Russell (0.0488).

There were 87 single-season leaders in HR/9IP through 2018 who had pitched a season without giving up a home run.  All played prior to 1927.

The active leaders in HR/9IP through 2018 were Clayton Kershaw (0.6225), Adam Wainwright (0.6755), and Charlie Morton (0.7682).

References

Pitching statistics